Marion Stevens née Pepper, (born 1943) in Hayes, Middlesex, is a former international lawn and indoor bowls competitor for Australia.

Stevens emigrated to Australia in 1973 and played for the Keysborough Bowling Club before moving to the Dandenong Bowling Club. She won the triples and fours gold medal at the 1988 World Outdoor Bowls Championship in Auckland.

Stevens competed in the Commonwealth Games winning a gold medal in the women's fours at the 1990 Commonwealth Games, in Auckland.  In 2003 she was appointed as national selector for Australia.

References

1943 births
Australian female bowls players
English female bowls players
Bowls World Champions
Living people
Commonwealth Games gold medallists for Australia
Bowls players at the 1990 Commonwealth Games
Commonwealth Games medallists in lawn bowls
English emigrants to Australia
Sportspeople from Melbourne
Sportswomen from Victoria (Australia)
People from Hayes, Hillingdon
Sportspeople from London
Medallists at the 1990 Commonwealth Games